Susan Charlesworth (born January 12, 1954) is an American luger. She competed in the women's singles event at the 1980 Winter Olympics.

References

External links
 

1954 births
Living people
American female lugers
Olympic lugers of the United States
Lugers at the 1980 Winter Olympics
People from Weston, Massachusetts
Sportspeople from Middlesex County, Massachusetts
21st-century American women